Antonio Ciseri (25 October 1821 – 8 March 1891) was a Swiss-Italian painter of religious subjects.

Biography
He was born in  Ronco sopra Ascona, Switzerland. He went to Florence in 1833 to study drawing with Ernesto Bonaiuti. Within a year, by 1834 he was a pupil of Niccola and Pietro Benvenuti at the Accademia di Belle Arti in Florence; he was later taught by Giuseppe Bezzuoli, who greatly influenced the early part of his career. In 1849, he began offering instruction to young painters, and eventually ran a private art school. Among his earliest students was Silvestro Lega.

Ciseri's religious paintings are Raphaelesque in their compositional outlines and their polished surfaces, but are nearly photographic in effect. He fulfilled many important commissions from churches in Italy and Switzerland. Ciseri also painted a significant number of portraits. He died in Florence on 8 March 1891. Among his other pupils were the painters Oreste Costa, Giuseppe Guzzardi, Alcide Segoni, Andrea Landini, Raffaello Sorbi, Niccolò Cannicci, Emanuele Trionfi, Girolamo Nerli, and Egisto Sarri.

Gallery

Notes

References 
 Ciseri, A., Spalletti, E., & Sisi, C. (1991). Omaggio ad Antonio Ciseri, 1821-1891: dipinti e disegni delle gallerie fiorentine : Firenze, Galleria d'arte moderna di Palazzo Pitti, 28 settembre-31 dicembre 1991. Firenze: Centro Di.  (Italian language)
 
 Art Gallery of Hamilton

1821 births
1891 deaths
People from Ticino
19th-century Italian painters
Italian male painters
Accademia di Belle Arti di Firenze alumni
19th-century Italian male artists
Catholic painters